André Olbrich (born 3 May 1967) is a German musician, best known as the co-founder and lead guitarist of power metal band Blind Guardian, in which he serves as one of the main composers with other founder Hansi Kürsch.

Olbrich was ranked number 76 out of 100 Greatest Heavy Metal Guitarists of All Time by Guitar World.  He is also ranked number 64 in Joel McIver's The 100 Greatest Metal Guitarists. Olbrich's guitar work often reflects vocalist Hansi Kürsch's singing.

Olbrich's style is influenced by his favourite bands, which include Queen, Judas Priest, Metallica and Black Sabbath. Additionally, Olbrich relies heavily on staccato technique.

Equipment 
Olbrich's gear
 ESP Guitars Original Series Horizon Custom
Body: Alder
Neck: Maple (Neck-thru)
Pickups: 2x EMG 81
Floyd Rose Tremolo System
24 Jumbo Frets
Original Jackson-style pointed headstock

 ESP Guitars Original Series M-II Neck Thru
Body: Alder with Maple Top
Neck: Maple (Neck-thru)
Pickups: 1x EMG 81 (bridge) 1x EMG SA (neck)
Floyd Rose Tremolo System
24 Jumbo Frets

 ESP Guitars Original Series Explorer Custom
Body: Mahogany
Neck: Maple (Neck-thru)
Pickups: 2x EMG 81
Floyd Rose Tremolo System
24 Jumbo Frets

 Ovation Guitar Legend
Strings: D'Addario .010 - .046
Picks: Jim Dunlop Nylon 1 MM
Amp: Engl Straight
Cabinets: 2x Marshall 1960 ( A & B )

 Amplification
He is believed to use Marshall amps for his distortion/lead riffs:
Marshall JCM 900 Dual Reverb
Marshall TSL 60 (Triple Super Lead)
Marshall cabinets 4x12 (with Celestion V30 speakers)

 Rack
ENGL savage
Furman Powerconditioner
Shure LX Wireless System
Rocktron Patchmate
Yamaha SPX 990
Ibanez Tubescreamer
Hughes & Kettner "Red Box" Pro
Morley Power Wah
Dunlop crybaby 535q (used during A Twist In The Myth tour)
Boss AC2 Acoustic Simulator

Trivia 
In 2020, Russian malacologist Alexander Fedosov named four new species of Clavus canalicularis mollusk in honour of four rock guitarists. One of them, Clavus andreolbrichi, was named in honour of Andre Olbrich.

References

External links 

Blind Guardian official website

Living people
German heavy metal guitarists
German male guitarists
Blind Guardian members
Lead guitarists
Musicians from Düsseldorf
1967 births